Stokesia is a genus of single-celled ciliates in the family Stokesiidae. The only species in this genus is Stokesia vernalis.

References

 Stokesiidae on www.taxonomy.nl

Stokesiidae
Ciliate genera